Hostinné is a town in Trutnov District in the Hradec Králové Region of the Czech Republic. It has about 4,300 inhabitants. It lies on the Elbe river. The town centre is well preserved and is protected by law as an urban monument zone.

Geography

It lies in the Giant Mountains Foothills. The town is situated in the valley of the Elbe River.

History
The first written mention of Hostinné is from 1270. It was founded during the reign of King Ottokar II of Bohemia, during the colonization of the upper Elbe.

During the Hussite Wars in 1424, Hostinné was besieged by Jan Žižka but never conquered. The town achieved the greatest prosperity during the rule of lords of Wallenstein in 1521–1634, especially after a large fire in 1610, when all the notable buildings in the town were reconstructed in the Renaissance style.

From 1938 to 1945 it was annexed by Nazi Germany and administered as part of Reichsgau Sudetenland.

Demographics

Economy
Hostinné is known for its paper mill. The tradition of this industry started here in 1835.

Transport
Hostinné is located on the railway lines Trutnov–Kolín and Trutnov-Vrchlabí. There are three railway stations: Hostinné, Hostinné město, and Prosečné, which serves the neighbouring municipality of Prosečné.

Sights

The town square, called just Náměstí ("The Square") has regular rectangular shape. Its main landmark is the town hall, mentioned already in the 14th century. The tower was added in 1525. It was rebuilt after a fire in 1610 and decorated with sgraffito. In the middle of the square is a Baroque Marian column from 1678.

The Church of the Holy Trinity is as old as the town. Its main part is from the Renaissance period. It has a -high tower with two bells from 1599 and 1612.

The Church of Saint Francis of Assisi from 1598 was originally a small cemetery church. In 1678–1684, the Franciscan monastery was built next to the church and the church was donated to the monks, who later extended it. Today, the monastery church houses a unique collection of plaster casts of ancient sculptures dating from 1912.

Notable people
Karel Klíč (1841–1926), painter, photographer, inventor of photogravure
Emil Votoček (1872–1950), chemist, composer and music theorist
Victor Lustig (1890–1947), con artist known for "selling the Eiffel tower twice"

Twin towns – sister cities

Hostinné is twinned with:
 Bensheim, Germany
 Wojcieszów, Poland

References

External links

Virtual show

Cities and towns in the Czech Republic
Populated places in Trutnov District
Populated places on the Elbe